Sexually Transmitted Infections is a peer-reviewed medical journal that publishes original research, descriptive epidemiology, evidence-based reviews and comment on the clinical, public health, translational, sociological and laboratory aspects of sexual health, HIV and AIDS, from around the world. It also publishes educational articles, letters, a blog and podcasts.

It is the official journal of the British Association for Sexual Health and HIV (BASHH). 

Its editor-in-chief is Anna Maria Geretti (Institute of Infection and Global Health, University of Liverpool, UK).

Abstracting and indexing 
The journal is abstracted and indexed in Web of Science Core Collection: Science Citation Index, Science Citation Index Extended; BIOSIS Reviews; Current Contents: Clinical Medicine, Life Sciences, MEDLINE (Index Medicus), PubMed Central (BMJ Open Access Special Collections), Google Scholar, Scopus, Excerpta Medica/EMBASE and CINAHL.

External links
 
 British Association for Sexual Health and HIV
 Australasian Chapter of Sexual Health Medicine

Sexology journals
Microbiology journals
BMJ Group academic journals
Publications established in 1925
English-language journals
8 times per year journals